Trimbakrao Shrirangrao Bhise is an Indian politician from Maharashtra. He is a one-term Member of the Maharashtra Legislative Assembly.

Political career
Bhise was elected as the member for Latur Rural in Maharashtra from 2014 to 2019. Bhise is a member of the Indian National Congress.

References

Living people
Maharashtra MLAs 2014–2019
Indian National Congress politicians
Maharashtra MLAs 2009–2014
Marathi politicians
Year of birth missing (living people)